Stereolepis doedereini, the striped jewfish,  is a marine, ray-finned fish in the family Polyprionidae, the wreckfish. It is found in the northwestern Pacific Ocean off Japan, Korea and the Far East of Russia.

References

Polyprionidae
Fish described in 1969